The Dean Forest Act 1861 (24 & 25 Vict c 40) is an Act of the Parliament of the United Kingdom. It is a public general Act. It was omitted from the third revised edition of the statutes because of its local and personal nature.

This Act was partly in force in Great Britain at the end of 2010.

The preamble and sections 2 and 5 and 6 and 17 and 22 and 27 were repealed by section 1 of, and Part VII of the Schedule to, the Statute Law (Repeals) Act 1969. These provisions had been agreed by the Forestry Commission to be obsolete, spent, unnecessary or superseded.

Section 7
In the case of any grant after the passing of the Dean Forest (Mines) Act 1904 of any gale to which that Act applies section 7 of the Dean Forest Act 1861 (which relates to the cesser and refixing of rents and royalties) has effect as though such number of years not exceeding sixty-three as may be specified in the grant were substituted for twenty-one years in that section.

Section 25
This section was repealed by section 1(4) of, and the Schedule to, the Wild Creatures and Forest Laws Act 1971.

Section 26
This section is amended by paragraph 2 of the Schedule to the Dean Forest and New Forest Acts (Amendment) Regulations 1979 (SI 1979/836).

See also
English land law
Dean Forest Act 1819
Dean Forest (Encroachments) Act 1838
Dean Forest Act 1842
Dean Forest Act 1667

References

External links
The Dean Forest Act 1861, as amended, from the National Archives.
The Dean Forest Act 1861, as originally enacted, from the National Archives.

United Kingdom Acts of Parliament 1861
English forest law
Forest of Dean
19th century in Gloucestershire